Mohammad Shamim Jairajpuri, commonly known as Shamim Jairajpuri, (born 1942) is an Indian zoologist. He received the Janaki Ammal National Award for Taxonomy bestowed by the Indian Ministry of Environment & Forests, the first individual to have been so awarded.

Positions 
In 1998, he became the first Vice Chancellor of the newly formed Maulana Azad National Urdu University and was credited in The Milli Gazette as "a leading personality" in the establishment of that university.

Honors and awards

Shiksha Ratna Puruskar, 2007, by India International Friendship Society
Lifetime Achievement Award in Parasitology, Indian Society for Parasitology

Notes

Sources
Biodiversity and Ecological Stability, Jairajpuri.

Further reading
Interview, Vigyan Prasar Science Portal, Government of India.

1942 births
20th-century Indian zoologists
Living people
Nematologists
People from Azamgarh district
Aligarh Muslim University alumni
Academic staff of Aligarh Muslim University
Jawaharlal Nehru Fellows
Scientists from Uttar Pradesh